This is a list of members of the South Australian Legislative Council from 1921 to 1924.

 The sole remaining member of the National Party in the Legislative Council, Central No. 2 District MLC William Humphrey Harvey, joined the Liberal Union in July 1921. 
 Liberal Union MLC John Lewis died on 25 August 1923. The vacancy was filled simultaneously with the 5 April 1924 elections for the other class of seats, with Lewis' successor serving a half-term.
 The Liberal Union and the National Party merged in October 1923 to form the Liberal Federation.
 Liberal Federation MLC John George Bice died on 9 November 1923. The vacancy was filled simultaneously with the 5 April 1924 elections for the other class of seats, with Bice's successor serving a half-term.
 The parliamentary wing of the Farmers and Settlers Association had been referred to by a variety of labels prior to this term of parliament, and had contested the 1921 election independently of the National-dominated "Progressive Country Party". After the 1921 election, the party formally adopted the "Country Party" name, consistent with their federal counterparts.

References
Parliament of South Australia — Statistical Record of the Legislature

Members of South Australian parliaments by term
20th-century Australian politicians